Common law is a legal system named after judge-made law, which plays an important role in it.

Common law may also refer to:
 Common-law marriage
 Jus commune, a type of broad, underlying law
 The Common Law (Holmes), an 1881 book by Oliver Wendell Holmes, Jr.
 The Common Law, a 1911 novel written by Robert W. Chambers, and its film adaptations:
 The Common Law (1916 film), an American silent drama film
 The Common Law (1923 film), a lost film
 The Common Law (1931 film), an American film starring Constance Bennett and Joel McCrea
 Common Law (1996 TV series), a United States sitcom by ABC
 Common Law (2012 TV series), a United States comedy-drama by the USA Network

See also
 Civil law (disambiguation)
 Civil code
 Criminal law